The Sangihe pitta (Erythropitta caeruleitorques) is a species of the pitta. It was considered a subspecies of the red-bellied pitta.  It is endemic to Indonesia where it occurs in the Sangihe Islands.  Its natural habitat is subtropical or tropical moist lowland forests.  It is threatened by habitat loss.

References

Sangihe pitta
Birds of the Sangihe Islands
Sangihe pitta